Khalid Muftah Mayuuf (born 2 July 1992) is a Qatari footballer who plays for Al-Rayyan. He plays primarily as a left back, but can also play as a left midfielder.

Career
Born in Al Wakrah, Muftah has played club football for Al-Wakrah and Lekhwiya. The merger of Lekhwiya and the El Jaish under the name of Al-Duhail

On 9 January 2019, Al-Wakrah has signed  Khalid Muftah for one seasons from Al-Duhail.

On 16 July 2019, Al-Rayyan has signed  Khalid Muftah for one seasons from Al-Duhail.

He made his senior international debut for Qatar in 2010, and has appeared in FIFA World Cup qualifying matches.

International goals
Scores and results list Qatar's goal tally first.

References

1992 births
Living people
Qatari footballers
Qatar international footballers
Al-Wakrah SC players
Lekhwiya SC players
Al-Duhail SC players
Al-Rayyan SC players
Qatar Stars League players
Qatari Second Division players
Association football fullbacks
Association football midfielders
2011 AFC Asian Cup players
2015 AFC Asian Cup players
Footballers at the 2010 Asian Games
Asian Games competitors for Qatar